Eilema polioplaga is a moth of the subfamily Arctiinae. It was described by George Hampson in 1901. It is found in Kenya and Tanzania.

References

 

polioplaga
Moths described in 1901